MLS Cup 2000 was the fifth edition of the MLS Cup, the championship match of Major League Soccer (MLS), which took place on October 15, 2000, at Robert F. Kennedy Memorial Stadium in Washington, D.C. It was contested by the Kansas City Wizards and Chicago Fire to decide the champion of the 2000 MLS season.

Kansas City became the first Western Conference team to win the MLS Cup, with the lone goal of the match scored in the 11th minute by Miklos Molnar. It was also the first MLS Cup to not feature a team from the Eastern Conference club, due to the three-division system used from 2000 to 2001. The match was watched by 39,159 spectators and broadcast nationally on ABC with commentary by Jack Edwards and Ty Keough.

Venue

Robert F. Kennedy Memorial Stadium in Washington, D.C., the home of D.C. United, was chosen to host MLS Cup 2000. It previously hosted MLS Cup 1997, during which United won their second league championship, the 1994 FIFA World Cup, and the 1996 Olympics men's soccer tournament. The 2000 final was the first MLS Cup to not feature D.C. United, as the team failed to qualify for the playoffs.

At the time of the match in October 2000, seating capacity of the stadium was 56,454 spectators. RFK Stadium was officially announced as the host on February 23, 2000. The other bidder, Raymond James Stadium in Tampa, Florida, had been favored by the league and was unable to resolve a scheduling conflict with a college football team until too late in the selection process.

Road to the final

The MLS Cup is the post-season championship of Major League Soccer, a professional club soccer league based in the United States. The 2000 season was the fifth in the league's history and was contested by twelve teams organized into three divisions (later renamed conferences), each with four teams. The 32-match regular season, which ran for 26 weeks from March to September, was arranged to have each team play opponents within their division four times and six teams outside of their division twice; the regular season also had a set of four home-and-away matches for two out-of-division teams, determined by standings from the opposite conference in the 1999 season. Prior to the season, MLS eliminated the previously-used countdown clock and shootout tiebreakers in favor of international rules. Referees would manage time on a count-up clock with stoppage time and tied matches would be allowed following two periods of five-minute golden goal overtime.

The MLS Cup Playoffs ran from mid-September to October and was contested by the winners of the three divisions and five wild card teams with the most points regardless of division, who were then seeded based on overall standings. The playoffs were organized into three rounds, the first two being a home-and-away series organized into a best-of-three format. Teams were awarded three points for a win and one point for a draw, and the first team to earn five points would advance. The MLS Cup final remained a single match at a predetermined venue.

MLS Cup 2000 was contested by the Kansas City Wizards of the Western Division and the Chicago Fire of the Central Division. Both teams finished atop their respective divisions with 57 points, but the Wizards clinched the Supporters' Shield on the goal difference tiebreaker by two goals. The Fire, who won the MLS Cup in 1998, were the top-scoring team during the 2000 season, while the Wizards conceded the fewest goals. Kansas City and Chicago met twice during the regular season, trading wins at home; the Wizards won 4–3 on March 25 and the Fire won 3–2 on June 4. MLS Cup 2000 was the first edition of the league's championship to not feature D.C. United, whose stadium was used for the match.

Kansas City Wizards

The Kansas City Wizards (originally the "Wiz") qualified for the playoffs in their first two seasons, finishing atop the Western Conference in 1997, but had never appeared in the MLS Cup final. The Wizards then finished with a 12–20 record in 1998 and failed to qualify for the playoffs under head coach Ron Newman, who was fired after a 0–7 start the following year. Newman was replaced by Bob Gansler, who finished the 1999 season with a 8–24 record, the second-worst in the league, while rebuilding the team's roster. Several members of the inaugural season's team, including forward Vitalis Takawira and defenders Sean Bowers and Scott Uderitz, were waived by the Wizards at the end of the 1999 season, while Alexi Lalas announced his retirement.

Gansler and new general manager Curt Johnson made several key signing in the offseason, beginning with the acquisition of Danish forward Miklos Molnar from Sevilla F.C. in January 2000. The Wizards traded defender Scott Vermillion to the Colorado Rapids in exchange for defenders Peter Vermes and Matt McKeon, who had previously played for the Wiz. The team signed two players they selected in the 2000 MLS SuperDraft: defender Nick Garcia, the second-overall pick, and Kerry Zavagnin, a third-round pick from the A-League. Kansas City finished their preseason with a 3–2–2 record, including two weeks in Bolivia, and saw the return of goalkeeper Tony Meola from an injury that kept him from playing for most of the 1999 season.

The Wizards opened the 2000 season with a 4–3 defeat of the Chicago Fire and went on an eleven-match unbeaten streak, amassing a 10–0–2 record through the end of May. The team's turnaround was credited to an improved defense, conceding only five goals and allowing Meola to earn a league-record shutout streak of 681 minutes, and consistent production from Molnar, who scored nine goals. The streak was broken by Chicago, who won 3–2 at Soldier Field on June 4, but Kansas City remained atop the league standings with an eight-point lead over the Los Angeles Galaxy in the Western Division.

Kansas City went winless in four league matches for most of June, in part due to the absence of Molnar while playing for the Danish national team, but maintained their home shutout streak. The team were also eliminated from the U.S. Open Cup in a penalty shootout by the Chicago Sockers of the USL Premier Development League in the third tier. After a 2–0 defeat of Los Angeles and a scoreless draw with the San Jose Earthquakes, the Wizards where shutout in three consecutive losses before closing out July with a 3–1 victory against the Columbus Crew. Kansas City was represented in the 2000 MLS All-Star Game with five players, including West captain Preki, and manager Bob Gansler.

The Wizards' lead in the Western Division standings narrowed to four points by early August as the team lost 5–1 and drew 1–1 with the Galaxy in back-to-back matches. Kansas City then lost Meola to a national team call-up and forwards Molnar and Mo Johnston to injuries, but were able to win 3–0 in San Jose with a starting lineup of reserve players. Following a 2–1 loss to the Miami Fusion at home, the Wizards began a five-match stretch to close out the season, including four matches played on the road. The team earned draws against the MetroStars and Colorado Rapids, clinching a playoff spot, while four of its forwards were sidelined with injuries. Kansas City clinched the Western Division title with a 1–0 road victory against the New England Revolution, which was followed by the Supporters' Shield through a draw against the Tampa Bay Mutiny with several reserve players. Gansler was named Coach of the Year for his team's improved record, while Tony Meola earned the MLS MVP Award, Goalkeeper of the Year, and Comeback Player of the Year for his league-record 16 shutouts. Peter Vermes was also named Defender of the Year for his role in the Wizards' league-best 29 goals conceded.

In the quarterfinals of the MLS Cup Playoffs, Kansas City faced the eighth-seed Colorado Rapids, who had eliminated them in the first round of the 1997 playoffs. The Wizards opened their playoff run with a 1–0 victory at home through a Molnar goal in the 18th minute, but were held to a scoreless draw at Mile High Stadium in Denver to force a third match in the series. The Rapids had the majority of scoring chances in both matches, but were denied by Meola's goalkeeping and a strong defensive performance from the Wizards. Kansas City advanced to the semifinals with a 3–2 victory at home in the third leg of the series, clinching a 7–1 lead on points. The Wizards took the lead in the 11th minute through a goal from Chris Henderson and followed up with two goals early in the second half from Molnar in the 65th minute and Francisco Gomez in the 69th minute; Paul Bravo scored for the Rapids a minute after Gomez's goal, but the team failed to mount a comeback after Junior Agogo was sent off with a red card.

The Wizards played the semifinals against the fifth-seeded Los Angeles Galaxy, who had eliminated them in the 1996 playoffs and had finished as MLS Cup runners-up in 1999. The first leg at Arrowhead Stadium in Kansas City ended in a scoreless draw as six yellow cards were given to players, including three in overtime. The Wizards lost the second leg at the Rose Bowl in overtime by a 2–1 scoreline, having earned a 1–1 draw in regulation time. Kansas City fell behind in the 16th minute from a shot by Cobi Jones, but midfielder Matt McKeon equalized in the 29th minute; substitute defender Danny Califf, who had returned from the Summer Olympics team, scored a header in the third minute of golden goal overtime to clinch a Galaxy victory. In the deciding third leg at Arrowhead Stadium, the Wizards went ahead in the 22nd minute through a Molnar penalty kick and won 1–0 in regulation time, tying the series at four points apiece. During the sixth minute of the ensuing sudden-death overtime, Molnar scored the team's first golden goal of the season by collecting an errant ball from Danny Califf, who had also conceded the penalty kick in regulation time.

Chicago Fire

The Chicago Fire entered the league as an expansion team in 1998 and won the MLS Cup and U.S. Open Cup in their inaugural season under the direction of head coach Bob Bradley and a core of veteran players from Eastern Europe. Their second season ended in the first round of the playoffs, where they were eliminated by the Dallas Burn, who mounted a comeback in the third match of the series to win 3–2. The Fire were able to retain most of their starting players over the offseason, but released veterans Roman Kosecki and Jerzy Podbrożny to Polish clubs and lost Frank Klopas to retirement. In early February, Chicago acquired midfielder DaMarcus Beasley from Los Angeles and selected defender Carlos Bocanegra with the fourth pick in the MLS SuperDraft to add younger talent to their starting lineup. Bulgarian forward Hristo Stoichkov was signed to a one-year contract the following month to serve as a veteran star for the team; his signing required the trade of Francis Okaroh to Miami for compliance with the league's salary cap.

After a month-long preseason in Florida and Costa Rica, the Fire began their regular season campaign with four consecutive away matches and played without goalkeeper Zach Thornton due to a calf injury. Chicago were defeated in their first two matches, losing 4–2 to Dallas and 4–3 to Kansas City, while captain Peter Nowak and midfielder Chris Armas were sidelined with their own injuries. Backup goalkeeper Greg Sutton was waived by the team after starting in the two losses and replaced by Chris Snitko, acquired in a trade with Kansas City; Snitko's acquisition forced a further trade of forward Junior Agogo to comply with the league's salary cap ahead of the signing of veteran midfielder Mike Sorber from the New England Revolution. The Fire closed out their road tour with a 2–0 victory against the Columbus Crew and a 2–3 loss to D.C. United in overtime.

Chicago returned home to Soldier Field with a 1–0 victory against the Miami Fusion, due in part to Thornton's return from his injury and the debuts of Bocanegra and Sorber for the team. The Fire settled into a stretch of five home fixtures over seven matches, winning four times and improving their record to 6–5–1 to overtake Dallas and Tampa Bay for first place in the Central Division. Stoitchkov was left out of the starting lineup for most of May due to a groin strain and replaced by Ante Razov, who recorded 10 goals in 12 matches to lead MLS in scoring and earned the first hat-trick in club history. Chicago also lost a trio of key players—Razov, Armas, and defender C. J. Brown—to the U.S. national team for the 2000 U.S. Cup for two weeks in June; as a result, the team dipped into second in the Central Division before regaining their lead with a victories against Kansas City and Miami at home.

The Fire stayed atop the Central Division and were five points behind Kansas City in the overall league standings by late June, but conceded late goals to tie Los Angeles and San Jose during a three-match road trip. As the team entered a crowded stretch of league and U.S. Open Cup matches, they lost several players to international call-ups as well as both Stoichkov to a torn groin muscle and defender Luboš Kubík to a sprained knee for a month. Chicago fell behind Tampa Bay in the Central Division standings entering the All-Star break at the end of July after several draws and overtime matches. The Fire defeated Tampa Bay to draw level with them on points atop the Central Division and the two team stayed tied through two more matches in mid-August.

With four of six remaining matches against Central Division rivals, the Fire began an unbeaten streak to clinch the division title and earn a 17–9–6 overall record for the regular season. Following a victory against the Los Angeles Galaxy and tie with Tampa Bay, the latter ending with two injured defenders, Chicago won three consecutive home matches to reach second place in the overall league standings. The Fire finished the regular season with a 3–2 victory in Columbus and tied Kansas City atop the league standings with 57 points, but lost the Supporters' Shield through a tiebreaker. Chicago would enter the playoffs without several injured players as well as Olympic call-ups Josh Wolff and Evan Whitfield, requiring additional lineup changes. Bocanegra won the MLS Rookie of the Year Award, while the midfield trio of Armas, Nowak, and Stoichkov were named to the MLS Best XI for their regular season performances.

In the playoff quarterfinals, Chicago faced the seventh-seeded New England Revolution, the only team they hadn't defeated during the regular season. The first leg, played on damaged turf at Soldier Field after a National Football League game, remained scoreless at half-time but opened with a goal in the 50th minute by Wolde Harris to give the visiting Revolution a lead. The Fire responded with an equalizer four minutes later through an own goal by Mauricio Wright and a second goal in the 73rd minute from Dema Kovalenko to win 2–1. The series was tied at three points apiece after New England won 2–1 in the second leg at Foxboro Stadium, taking the lead through a goal from Eric Wynalda in the 18th minute. A penalty from Stoitchkov was saved in first-half stoppage time, but Kovalenko managed to score an equalizer for Chicago in the 83rd minute; the Revolution responded two minutes later with a header from Wright to force a decisive third match. The Fire hosted the final quarterfinal leg and set an MLS record for largest margin of victory in the playoffs by winning 6–0, scoring four times during the first half. Stoitchkov and Razov each scored twice, the latter earning four assists to set a team record, while Nowak added a first-half stoppage time shot and Sam George finished off the match in the 75th minute with his goal.

The Fire opened their semifinal series against the New York/New Jersey MetroStars with a 3–0 victory at Soldier Field despite missing Nowak to a hamstring injury. Stoitchkov and Kovalenko each scored in the first half, while Razov added an insurance goal late in the second half and Thornton made eight saves to keep a shutout. The MetroStars played the second leg with first-choice goalkeeper Mike Ammann, who had returned from injury, and shutout the Fire 2–0 at Giants Stadium to force a third match in the series. Mark Chung opened the scoring in the 40th minute and Adolfo Valencia added an insurance goal in the 84th minute, while the Fire offense were stifled and unable to create scoring chances until late in the second half. Chicago clinched a series victory and their second MLS Cup berth by defeating the MetroStars 3–2 at Soldier Field. Following goals from Brown and Stoitchkov in the first half-hour of the match, the MetroStars rallied with a pair of goals from Valencia within four minutes to tie the match at 2–2 heading into half-time. The winning goal came in the 88th minute from Razov, who received a long pass from Armas and dribbled around Ammann to break the second-half deadlock.

Summary of results
Note: In all results below, the score of the finalist is given first (H: home; A: away). Playoffs were in best-of-three format requiring five points to advance and sudden death extra time as a tiebreaker.

Broadcasting

The MLS Cup final was broadcast in the United States on ABC with English commentary and Spanish via secondary audio programming. The English broadcast was led by play-by-play announcer Jack Edwards and color commentator Ty Keough, who were joined by studio hosts Rob Stone and Alexi Lalas. The Spanish broadcast comprised play-by-play announcer Roberto Abramowitz and MetroStars coach Octavio Zambrano as color commentator. The ABC broadcast drew a 1.0 national rating, matching the 1999 final. The local broadcast in the Kansas City area had an estimated 5 percent share of televisions, falling behind concurrent broadcasts of the film Blank Check and a Kansas City Chiefs game that drew 64 percent.

The match was also carried via streaming radio on Internetsoccer.com with English commentary from Dave Johnson and Miami Fusion coach Ray Hudson. Local radio stations in the Chicago area also broadcast the match, including WIND-AM in Spanish and WNVR-AM in Polish.

Match

Summary

The match began with Chicago on the offensive early, with Ante Razov and Hristo Stoitchkov creating several attempts within the first ten minutes. In the 11th minute, however, Wizards midfielder Chris Klein stole the ball from Chicago's Diego Gutiérrez near midfield and stormed down the touch line. Klein's cross from the right wing made contact with Fire midfielder Jesse Marsch who failed to clear the ball, allowing Miklos Molnar to make light contact and roll the ball past keeper Zach Thornton for the only goal of the match. The Fire responded by using its attacking forces to find an equalizer, but failed to break the Wizards defense and goalkeeper Tony Meola, who made ten saves in the final. Meola earned his 5th shutout of the playoffs in addition to 16 clean sheets to his name from the regular season.

Details

References

MLS Cup
MLS Cup
MLS Cup 2000
MLS Cup 2000
Soccer in Washington, D.C.
Sports competitions in Washington, D.C.
October 2000 sports events in the United States
2000 in sports in Washington, D.C.